Herzenstein is a surname, meaning "heart stone" in the German language. Notable people named Herzenstein include:

Mikhail Herzenstein (1859–1906), Russian-Jewish scientist and politician 
Solomon Herzenstein (1854–1894), Russian zoologist

Jewish surnames
German-language surnames
Yiddish-language surnames
Surnames from ornamental names